T. P. McAuley was an American politician in the state of Washington. He served in the Washington House of Representatives from 1895 to 1897.

References

Members of the Washington House of Representatives